Møgeltønder Parish is a parish in the Diocese of Ribe in Tønder Municipality, Denmark. The parish contains the town of Møgeltønder.

References 

Tønder Municipality
Parishes of Denmark